Lori Lieberman (born November 15, 1951) is an American singer-songwriter who accompanies herself on guitar and piano. She first came to public attention in the early 1970s with a series of albums on Capitol Records, the first of which featured the first recording of "Killing Me Softly with His Song". After a long gap due to a retirement in the early 1980s, she resumed her recording career in the mid-1990s.

Biography

Early life
Lieberman, the middle of three Jewish sisters, spent her childhood and adolescence travelling between California and Switzerland (where she attended the International School of Geneva from Year 5 till her graduation in 1970) consequent to her father's career in chemical engineering. She then attended Pine Manor College. 

Lieberman began singing and composing at a young age, simultaneously acquiring a taste for French singers and songwriters as well as American rock and pop music. The latter passion was fed by an older sister who played albums by Joni Mitchell, Judy Collins, Leonard Cohen and Jefferson Airplane.

First recording career
Shortly after she returned to America to study in her late teens, Lieberman was signed to a production, recording and publishing deal struck between Capitol Records and songwriters Charles Fox and Norman Gimbel. Lieberman's contributions to the process were occasionally credited during this period of her career, most notably on "My Lover Do You Know" which appeared on her first album, 1972's Lori Lieberman, and which was singled out for praise by Billboard magazine.

In the gap between her first and second albums, "Killing Me Softly With His Song", a track from Lieberman's debut, was recorded by Roberta Flack – becoming a US No. 1 and international hit and rapidly overshadowing Lieberman's own, more understated original which had until that point been gaining traction on radio. Undeterred, Lieberman returned in 1973 with Becoming, her first album to achieve a 199 placing on the Billboard Top 200.

Two more Lori Lieberman albums, A Piece of Time (1974) and Straw Colored Girl (1975), appeared on Capitol Records. In the wake of her departure from Capitol, material from her first four albums was compiled on the European release, The Best of Lori Lieberman. In 1977, Lieberman provided vocals for the song, "Great American Melting Pot" for the television show Schoolhouse Rock. She sang a song in the 1980s television show Fame.

After a period of silence, and with her career no longer helmed by Gimbel and Fox, Lieberman returned with Letting Go (Millennium Records, 1978, distributed by Casablanca Records/RCA Records), recorded in New York with producer Paul Leka. Lieberman's compositions were fully credited on the album. The song, "Jingle", spoke to Lieberman's growing dissatisfaction with the music industry. Soon after the release of Letting Go, Lieberman abandoned her career.

Hiatus and second career
By the early 1990s, Lieberman was a mother of three who had settled in California and built a life out of the spotlight. When a neighbor, Joseph Cali (who had played Joey in Saturday Night Fever and was to become Lieberman's third husband) prompted her to return to music, she was initially reluctant but put aside these misgivings and recorded the album A Thousand Dreams which was largely made up of her own songs, appearing on the independent Pope Records label, and engineered by Mark Levinson. The album and its follow-up, 1996's Home of Whispers, were recorded live and marketed towards the audiophile community. A third release, Gone Is The Girl, a studio album with overdubs, came out in 1998 prior to the demise of the Pope label. This collection combined new Lieberman songs with some revisited material from her past. In 2003, Lieberman released another album of original material, Monterey, which came out via her own company, Drive On Records.

From 2009 onwards, Lieberman enjoyed increased visibility. Following the release of Gun Metal Sky (Drive On Records) in 2009, she became a major label recording artist for the first time since the 1970s when V2 Records (originally a subsidiary of Virgin Records and now part of the Universal Music Group) took up the option of remastering, repackaging and distributing Gun Metal Sky in territories outside America. For its European incarnation, the revised album appeared in 2010 under the new title Takes Courage. With funding and promotional support behind her, Lieberman started to tour Europe, drawing audiences sufficient in number to fill concert halls. 2011's swiftly released follow-up Bend Like Steel (Drive On/V2) consolidated her new-found success and led to her first forays into promotional videos. In 2012, Lieberman's most overtly political single, "Rise", a response to the global economic crisis and the inequitable division of wealth, was released worldwide with an accompanying video. "Rise" was included on Lieberman's 2013 album, Bricks Against The Glass (Drive On/Rough Trade Benelux).

"Killing Me Softly" controversy
Since the mid-1990s as Lieberman's profile has grown, Gimbel and Fox have publicly denied the original working method they were reported to have established with Lieberman at the outset of her career, namely that Lieberman's own writing was the essential material from which their songs grew. This dispute has specifically focused on "Killing Me Softly with His Song", which had hitherto been said to have sprung from a poem written by Lieberman following her attendance at a Don McLean concert.

Both Gimbel and Fox asserted in print that Lieberman had had no involvement in the creation of the song. Don McLean supported Lieberman both on his website and from the stage of a concert he invited her to attend in 2010. However, the matter only reached an unequivocal conclusion when contemporaneous articles from the early 1970s were exhumed, all of them vindicating Lieberman. On April 5, 1973, Gimbel had informed the Daily News, "She [Lori Lieberman] told us about this strong experience she had listening to McLean... I had a notion this might make a good song so the three of us discussed it. We talked it over several times, just as we did for the rest of the numbers we wrote for this album and we all felt it had possibilities.". Lieberman, Gimbel and Fox were described in a Billboard magazine article in 1973 as a songwriting team.

Discography
 Lori Lieberman (Capitol Records, 1972)
 Becoming (Capitol Records, 1973) US No. 192
 A Piece of Time (Capitol Records, 1974)
 Straw Colored Girl (Capitol Records, Bovema, EMI, 1975)
 The Best Of Lori Lieberman (Capitol Records, Bovema, EMI, 1976)
 Letting Go (Millennium Records, Casablanca Records RCA Records, 1978)
 A Thousand Dreams (Pope Music, 1995)
 Home of Whispers (Pope Music, 1996)
 Gone is the Girl (Pope Music, 1998)
 Monterey (Drive On Records, 2003)
 Gun Metal Sky (Drive On Records, 2009)
 Takes Courage (V2 Records, 2010)
 Bend Like Steel (Drive On Records/V2 Records, 2011)
 Bricks Against The Glass (Drive On Records/Rough Trade Benelux, 2013)
 Ready for The Storm (Butler Records, 2015)
 The Girl and The Cat (Butler Records, 2019)

References

External links
Official website

Jewish American composers
American expatriates in Switzerland
American women singer-songwriters
American folk singers
Jewish American musicians
Singer-songwriters from California
Living people
1951 births
Jewish rock musicians
Jewish folk singers
Guitarists from California
20th-century American guitarists
Capitol Records artists
20th-century American women guitarists
21st-century American Jews
21st-century American women